The Chicken's Neck, or the Akhnoor Dagger, is the name for a narrow strip of Pakistani territory that extends into the Indian Union Territory of Jammu and Kashmir south of Akhnoor. It has been a focal point in all the wars between India and Pakistan, as it is seen as a corridor towards most of Jammu and Kashmir. One of the main thrusts of Operation Grand Slam in the Indo-Pakistani War of 1965 was to capture Akhnoor through the Chicken's Neck, which could potentially have choked the Indian Army in the region; however, the plan failed. 

Regions of Punjab, Pakistan
Sialkot District
Jammu district
Geography of Jammu and Kashmir
India–Pakistan border